Euzophera aglaeella is a species of snout moth in the genus Euzophera. It was described by Ragonot in 1887, and is known from Arizona.

Taxonomy
The species was formerly treated as a synonym of Euzophera semifuneralis.

References

Moths described in 1887
Phycitini
Moths of North America